Wollombi, an electoral district of the Legislative Assembly in the Australian state of New South Wales was created in 1859 and abolished in 1894.


Election results

Elections in the 1890s

1891

Elections in the 1880s

1889

1887

1886 by-election

1885

1882

1880

Elections in the 1870s

1877

1874

1872

1870 by-election

Elections in the 1860s

1869

1864

1860

1860 by-election

Elections in the 1850s

1859

Notes

References

Former electoral districts of New South Wales